Georgi Yordanov Naydenov (born 28 January 1936) is a Bulgarian footballer. He competed in the men's tournament at the 1960 Summer Olympics.

References

External links
 

1936 births
Living people
Bulgarian footballers
Bulgaria international footballers
Olympic footballers of Bulgaria
Footballers at the 1960 Summer Olympics
Footballers from Plovdiv
Botev Plovdiv players
Association football goalkeepers